Badminton at the 2019 European Games was held at Falcon Club, Minsk, Belarus from 24 to 30 June. The badminton programme in 2019 included men's and women's singles competitions; men's, women's and mixed doubles competitions.

Qualification

Competition schedule

Medalists

Medal table

Medalists

References

 
Sports at the 2019 European Games
2019
European Games